Bezaj is a village in Miyan Taleqan Rural District, in the Central District of Taleqan County, Alborz Province, Iran.

It is located in the Alborz (Elburz) mountain range.

At the 2006 census, its population was 335, in 84 families.

References 

Populated places in Taleqan County
Settled areas of Elburz